Paulschulzia is a genus of green algae, specifically of the family Tetrasporaceae.

The genus was circumscribed by Heinrich Leonhards Skuja in Symb. Bot. Upsal. vol.9 (3) on page 118 in 1948.

The genus name of Paulschulzia is in honour of Paul Schulz(-Danzig) (x - 1935), who was a German naturalist (Phycology and Palaeontology), teacher in Danzig.

Species
As accepted by WoRMS;
 Paulschulzia indica 
 Paulschulzia pseudovolvox 
 Paulschulzia tenera

References

External links

Scientific references

Scientific databases

 AlgaTerra database
 Index Nominum Genericorum

Chlamydomonadales genera
Chlamydomonadales